El sol sale para todos (English title: The sun rises for everyone) is a Venezuelan telenovela written by César Miguel Rondón and produced by Venevisión in 1986.

Hilda Carrero and Eduardo Serrano starred as the main protagonists with Henry Galué, Herminia Martínez and Reneé de Pallás as the main antagonists.

Plot
Magdalena is a mature woman with dreams and struggles to improve herself by attending university and working, but her husband Julian does not support her, preferring she limits herself to being a housewife and mother. She becomes a frustrated and disappointed woman for not receiving support and affection from her husband, aspiring to having an ideal marriage similar to the one her parents have. At university, she meets Santiago, a captivating man who is her professor. Little by little, their relationship grows and they begin to discover each other, as Santiago is stuck in a loveless marriage to Ana Cristina who pays little attention to their son. Will they be able to give it all up?.

Cast
 Hilda Carrero as Magdalena Pimentel de Zerpa
 Eduardo Serrano as Santiago Falcón
 Corina Azopardo as Manuela Larrazábal
 Guillermo Dávila as Luis Ignacio "Lucho" Pimentel
 Herminia Martínez as Ana Cristina Arismendi
 José Oliva as León Benigno Pimentel
 Eva Blanco as Cruz del Carmen "Crucita" Chacón de Pimentel
 Raúl Xiquez as Diógenes Arismendi
 Reneé de Pallás as Doña Florentina
 Henry Galué as Julián Zerpa
 Carmen Victoria Pérez as Antonieta
 Alma Ingianni as Aurora
 Vicente Tepedino as Felipe Larrazábal "Felipito"
 Ramón Hinojosa as Chonchón
 Fernando Flores as Damaso Arrieta
 Armando Jiménez as Juliancito Zerpa
 Enrique Alzugaray as Don Crisanto
 Esther Orjuela as Soledad
 Eduardo Gadea Perez as Padre Toñito Chacón
 Jimmy Verdum as Versalles
 Esperanza Magaz as Jacinta

References

External links
 

1986 telenovelas
Venevisión telenovelas
1980s Venezuelan television series
1986 Venezuelan television series debuts
1987 Venezuelan television series endings
Venezuelan telenovelas
Spanish-language telenovelas
Television shows set in Venezuela